Bernard Joseph Flanagan (March 31, 1908 – January 28, 1998) was an American prelate of the Roman Catholic Church. He served as bishop of the Diocese of Norwich in Connecticut (1953–1959) and as bishop of the Diocese of Worcester in Massachusetts (1959–1983).

Biography

Early life 
Bernard Flanagan was born on March 31, 1908, in Proctor, Vermont, to John B. and Alice (née McGarry) Flanagan. He studied at the College of the Holy Cross in Worcester, Massachusetts, and at the Pontifical North American College in Rome. 

Flanagan was ordained to the priesthood for the Diocese of Burlington by Cardinal Francesco Selvaggiani on December 8, 1931. He earned a doctorate in canon law from the Catholic University of America in Washington, D.C., in 1943. Flanagan then served as secretary to Bishop Edward Ryan and as chancellor of the diocese.

Bishop of Norwich 
On September 1, 1953, Flanagan was appointed the first bishop of the Diocese of Norwich by Pope Pius XII. Flanagan received his episcopal consecration on December 3, 1953, in Immaculate Conception Cathedral in Burlington, Vermont, from Bishop Edward Ryan, with Bishops Vincent Waters and John Cody serving as co-consecrators. He was formally installed five days later, on December 8, in St. Patrick's Cathedral in Norwich. During his tenure, Flanagan oversaw the establishment of several secondary schools and parishes within his diocese.

Bishop of Worcester 
Flanagan was named the second bishop of the Diocese of Worcester on August 8, 1959, by Pope John XXIII.  Flanagan was installed by Cardinal Richard Cushing on September 24, 1959. Flanagan attended the Second Vatican Council in Rome from 1962 to 1965, and was an ardent supporter of ecumenism. He once declared, "There are many paths that we can and must travel, as we work and pray for the fulfillment of Christ's prayer that 'all be one'. One of these paths is the association of yet separated Christian churches in local and regional councils."In 1973, the diocese joined the Worcester County Ecumenical Council, a predominantly Protestant organization. Flanagan also engaged in active dialogue with Archbishop Iakovos of the Greek Orthodox Church in America.

Retirement 
Pope John Paul II accepted Flanagan's resignation as bishop of the Diocese of Worcester on March 31, 1983. Bernard Flanagan died on January 28, 1998, in Worcester at age 89.

See also

 Catholic Church hierarchy
 Catholic Church in the United States
 Historical list of the Catholic bishops of the United States
 List of Catholic bishops of the United States
 Lists of patriarchs, archbishops, and bishops

References

External links
Roman Catholic Diocese of Norwich
Roman Catholic Diocese of Worcester

1908 births
1998 deaths
College of the Holy Cross alumni
Catholic University of America alumni
Pontifical North American College alumni
People from Proctor, Vermont
Roman Catholic Diocese of Burlington
20th-century Roman Catholic bishops in the United States
Roman Catholic bishops of Norwich
Participants in the Second Vatican Council
Religious leaders from Vermont
Roman Catholic bishops of Worcester, Massachusetts
Catholics from Vermont
American Roman Catholic clergy of Irish descent